The 1952 United States presidential election was the 42nd quadrennial presidential election and was held on Tuesday, November 4, 1952. Republican Dwight D. Eisenhower won a landslide victory over Democrat Adlai Stevenson II, which ended 20 years of Democratic rule that stretched back to 1932.

Illinois Governor Stevenson emerged victorious on the third presidential ballot of the 1952 Democratic National Convention by defeating Tennessee Senator Estes Kefauver, Georgia Senator Richard Russell Jr., and other candidates. The Republican nomination was primarily contested by Eisenhower, a general who was widely popular for his leadership in World War II, and the conservative Ohio Senator Robert A. Taft. With the support of Thomas E. Dewey and other party leaders, Eisenhower narrowly prevailed over Taft at the 1952 Republican National Convention with Richard Nixon, a young senator from California, as his running mate. In the first televised presidential campaign, Eisenhower, in sharp contrast to Stevenson, was charismatic and very well known.

Republicans attacked Truman's handling of the Korean War and the broader Cold War and alleged that Soviet spies had infiltrated the US government. Democrats faulted Eisenhower for failing to condemn Senators Joseph McCarthy, William E. Jenner, and other reactionary Republicans, who, they alleged, had engaged in reckless and unwarranted attacks. Stevenson tried to separate himself from the unpopular Truman administration but instead campaigned on the popularity of the New Deal and stoked fears of another Great Depression under a Republican administration.

Eisenhower retained his enormous popularity from the war, as was seen in his campaign slogan, "I Like Ike." Eisenhower's popularity and Truman's unpopularity led to a Republican victory, with Eisenhower winning 55.18% of the popular vote and carrying every state outside of the South and even Virginia, Tennessee, Florida, and Texas, Southern states that had voted for Democrats since the end of Reconstruction, with the exception of 1928. Republicans made gains among Democrats, especially urban and suburban Southerners, and white ethnics in the Northeast and Midwest.

Nominees

Republican Party

The fight for the Republican nomination was between General Dwight D. Eisenhower, who became the candidate of the party's moderate Eastern Establishment; Senator Robert A. Taft from Ohio, the longtime leader of the party's conservative wing; Governor Earl Warren of California, who appealed to Western delegates and independent voters; and former Governor Harold Stassen of Minnesota, who still had a base of support in the Midwest.

The moderate Eastern Republicans were led by New York Governor Thomas E. Dewey, the party's presidential nominee in 1944 and 1948. The moderates tended to be interventionists who felt that the country needed to fight the Cold War overseas and confront the Soviet Union in Eurasia. They were also willing to accept most aspects of the social welfare state created by the New Deal in the 1930s but sought to reform the programs to be more efficient and business-friendly. The moderates were also concerned with ending the Republicans' losing streak in presidential elections and felt that the popular Eisenhower had the best chance of beating the Democrats. For that reason, Dewey declined the notion of a third run for president despite his large amount of support within the party. The Republicans had been out of power for 20 years, and there was a strong sentiment that a proper two-party system needed to be re-established. It was also felt that the party winning the White House would have more incentive to rein in radicals and demagogues such as Wisconsin Senator Joseph McCarthy.

The conservative Republicans, led by Taft, were based in the Midwest and parts of the South. The Midwest was a bastion of conservatism and isolationist sentiment. Dislike of Europeans, in particular the British, was common, and there was a widespread feeling that the British manipulated American foreign policy and were eager to kowtow to the Soviet Union, although such attitudes had begun to change among the younger generation who had fought in World War II. In addition, the conservatives opposed much of the New Deal, regarding these programs as diminishing individual liberty and economic freedom. Taft had unsuccessfully sought the Republican nomination in the 1940 and 1948 presidential elections but lost both times to moderate candidates from New York: Wilkie and Dewey respectively. At the age of 63, Taft felt that it was his last chance to run for president so his friends and supporters, encompassing many party regulars, worked diligently on his behalf. His feelings were correct, as he died about nine months after the election.

Warren, although highly popular in California, refused to campaign in the presidential primaries, which limited his chances of winning the nomination. He retained the support of the California delegation, and his supporters hoped that in the event of an Eisenhower–Taft deadlock, Warren might emerge as a compromise candidate.

After being persuaded to run, Eisenhower scored a major victory in the New Hampshire primary in which his supporters wrote his name onto the ballot and gave him an upset victory over Taft. However, until the Republican National Convention, the primaries were divided fairly evenly between the two, and when the convention opened, the race for the nomination was still too close to call. Taft won the Nebraska, Wisconsin, Illinois, and South Dakota primaries, and Eisenhower won those in New Jersey, Pennsylvania, Massachusetts and Oregon. Stassen and Warren won only their home states of Minnesota and California respectively, which effectively ended their chances of earning the nomination. General Douglas MacArthur also won the support of ten delegates from various states (mostly in Oregon) but had made it clear from early in the race that he had no interest in being nominated.

Republican National Convention
When the 1952 Republican National Convention opened in Chicago, most political experts rated Taft and Eisenhower as about equal in delegate vote totals. Eisenhower's managers, led by both Dewey and Massachusetts Senator Henry Cabot Lodge Jr., accused Taft of "stealing" delegate votes in Southern states such as Texas and Georgia, and claimed that Taft's leaders in those states had unfairly denied delegate spots to Eisenhower supporters, putting Taft delegates in their place. Lodge and Dewey proposed to evict the Taft delegates in those states and replace them with Eisenhower delegates and called the proposal "Fair Play." Although Taft and his supporters angrily denied that charge, the convention voted to support Fair Play 658 to 548, and Taft lost many Southern delegates. Eisenhower's chances were boosted when several uncommitted state delegations, such as Michigan and Pennsylvania, decided to support him and also when Stassen released his delegates and asked them to support Eisenhower. The removal of many Southern delegates and the support of the uncommitted states decided the nomination in Eisenhower's favor.

However, the convention was among the most bitter and emotional in American history. When Senator Everett Dirksen from Illinois, a Taft supporter, pointed at Dewey on the convention floor during a speech and accused him of leading the Republicans "down the road to defeat," mixed boos and cheers rang out from the delegates, and there were even fistfights between some Taft and Eisenhower delegates.

In the end, Eisenhower narrowly defeated Taft on the first ballot. To heal the wounds caused by the battle, he visited Taft's hotel suite and met with him. Taft issued a brief statement congratulating Eisenhower on his victory, but he was bitter about the accusation that he had stolen delegates and withheld his active support for Eisenhower for several weeks after the convention. In September 1952, Taft and Eisenhower met again at Morningside Heights, in New York City. Taft promised there an active support of Eisenhower in exchange for the fulfillment of a number of requests such as a demand that Eisenhower would offer Taft's followers a fair share of patronage positions if he won the election and that Eisenhower would agree to balance the federal budget and "fight creeping domestic socialism in every field." Eisenhower agreed to the terms, and Taft campaigned assiduously for the Republican ticket. In fact, Eisenhower and Taft agreed on most domestic issues, and their disagreements were primarily on foreign policy.

Though there were initial suggestions that Warren could earn the party's vice-presidential slot for the second successive election if he withdrew and endorsed Eisenhower, he ultimately chose not to do so. Eisenhower wished to award the vice-presidential nod to Stassen, who had endorsed Eisenhower and held generally similar political positions. However, the party bosses wanted to find a running mate who could mollify Taft's supporters, as the schism between the moderate and conservative wings was so severe that it was feared that party's conservatives would run Taft as a third-party candidate.

Eisenhower had apparently given little thought to choosing his running mate. When asked, he replied that he assumed the convention would pick someone. The spot ultimately fell to the young California Senator Richard Nixon, who was viewed as a centrist. Nixon was known as an aggressive campaigner and a fierce anticommunist but as one who shied away from some of the more extreme ideas of the party's right wing, including isolationism and the dismantling of the New Deal. Most historians now believe that Eisenhower's nomination was the result of his perceived electability against the Democrats. Most of the delegates were conservatives who would probably have supported Taft if they felt that he could win the general election.

Despite not earning the presidential or the vice-presidential nomination, Warren would be appointed as Chief Justice of the United States in October 1953, and Stassen would hold various positions within Eisenhower's administration.

The balloting at the Republican convention went as follows:

Democratic Party

The expected candidate for the Democratic nomination was the incumbent President Harry S. Truman. Since the newly passed 22nd Amendment did not apply to whoever was president at the time of its passage, he was eligible to run again. However, Truman entered 1952 with his popularity plummeting, according to polls. The bloody and indecisive Korean War was dragging into its third year, Senator Joseph McCarthy's anticommunist crusade was stirring public fears of an encroaching "Red Menace," and the disclosure of widespread corruption among federal employees (including some high-level members of to the Truman administration) left Truman at a low political ebb. Polls showed that he had a 66% disapproval rating, a record that would be matched only decades later by Richard Nixon and surpassed by George W. Bush.

Truman's main opponent was the populist Tennessee Senator Estes Kefauver, who had chaired a nationally televised investigation of organized crime in 1951 and was known as a crusader against crime and corruption. The Gallup poll of February 15 showed Truman's weakness. Nationally, Truman was the choice of only 36% of Democrats, compared with 21% for Kefauver. Among independent voters, however, Truman had only 18%, and Kefauver led with 36%. In the New Hampshire primary, Kefauver upset Truman by winning 19,800 votes to Truman's 15,927 and capturing all eight delegates. Kefauver graciously said that he did not consider his victory "a repudiation of Administration policies, but a desire... for new ideas and personalities." Stung by that setback, however, Truman announced March 29 that he would not seek re-election. Truman insisted in his memoirs, however, that he had decided not to run for re-election well before his defeat to Kefauver.

With Truman's withdrawal, Kefauver became the frontrunner for the nomination, and he won most of the primaries. Other primary winners were Senator Hubert Humphrey, who won his home state of Minnesota; Senator Richard Russell Jr. from Georgia, who won the Florida primary, and the diplomat W. Averell Harriman, who won West Virginia. However, most states still chose their delegates to the Democratic Convention by state conventions, which meant that the party bosses, especially the mayors and governors of large Northern and Midwestern states and cities, were able to choose the Democratic nominee. The bosses, including Truman himself, strongly disliked Kefauver since his investigations of organized crime had revealed connections between American Mafia figures and many of the big-city Democratic political organizations. The party bosses thus viewed Kefauver as a maverick who could not be trusted and so refused to support him for the nomination.

Instead, with Truman taking the initiative, they began to search for other more acceptable candidates. However, most of the other candidates had a major weakness. Russell had much Southern support, but his support of racial segregation and his opposition to civil rights for blacks led many liberal Northern and Midwestern delegates, pressed by their many black voters, to reject him. Truman favored Harriman of New York, but the latter had never held an elective office and was inexperienced in politics. Truman next turned to Vice-President Alben W. Barkley but at 74, he was rejected as being too old by leaders of labor unions, and he had little Northern support because he was another Southern segregationist.
Other minor or favorite son candidates included Oklahoma Senator Robert S. Kerr, Massachusetts Governor Paul A. Dever, Minnesota Senator Hubert Humphrey, and Arkansas Senator J. William Fulbright.

One candidate soon emerged who seemingly had few political weaknesses, Governor Adlai Stevenson of Illinois. The grandson of Vice-President Adlai E. Stevenson, he came from a distinguished family in Illinois and was well known as a gifted orator, intellectual, and political moderate. In the spring of 1952, Truman attempted to convince Stevenson to take the presidential nomination, but Stevenson stated that he wanted to run for re-election as Governor of Illinois. However, Stevenson never completely took himself out of the race, and as the convention approached, many party bosses and normally-apolitical citizens hoped that he could be "drafted" to run.

Democratic Convention
The 1952 Democratic National Convention was held in Chicago in the same Coliseum that the Republicans had gathered in several weeks earlier. Since the convention was being held in his home state, Governor Stevenson, who still proclaimed that he was not a presidential candidate, was asked to give the welcoming address to the delegates. He proceeded to give a witty and stirring address that led his supporters to begin a renewed round of efforts to nominate him despite his protests. After meeting with Jacob Arvey, the boss of the Illinois delegation, Stevenson finally agreed to enter his name as a candidate for the nomination. The party bosses from other large Northern and Midwestern states quickly joined in support. Kefauver led on the first ballot, but he had far fewer votes than necessary to win. Stevenson gradually gained strength until he was nominated on the third ballot.

After the delegates nominated Stevenson, the convention then turned to selecting a vice-presidential nominee. After narrowing it down to Senators John Sparkman, and A. S. Mike Monroney, President Truman and a small group of political insiders chose Sparkman, a conservative segregationist from Alabama, for the nomination. The convention largely complied and nominated Sparkman as Stevenson's running mate. He was chosen because of his Southern identity and conservative record, which party leaders hoped would create a balanced ticket.

Sparkman remained in the Senate until his retirement in 1978.

General election

Campaign issues
The Eisenhower campaign was one of the first presidential campaigns to make a major and concerted effort to win the female vote. Many of his radio and television commercials discussed topics such as education, inflation, ending the Korean War, and other issues that were thought to appeal to women. The Eisenhower campaign made extensive use of female campaign workers, who made phone calls to likely Eisenhower voters, distributed "Ike" buttons and leaflets, and threw parties to build support for the Republican ticket in their neighborhoods. On election day, Eisenhower won a solid majority of the female vote.

Eisenhower campaigned by attacking "Korea, Communism, and Corruption," issues that the Republicans regarded as the failures of the outgoing Truman administration to solve. The Eisenhower campaign accused the administration of "neglecting Latin America" and thus "leading them into the arms of wily Communist agents waiting to exploit local misery and capitalize on any opening to communize the Americas." Charges that Soviet spies had infiltrated the government plagued the Truman administration and became a "major campaign issue" for Eisenhower. The Republicans blamed the Democrats for the military's failure to be fully prepared to fight in Korea, accused the Democrats of harboring communist spies within the federal government, and criticized the Truman administration for the many officials who had been accused of various crimes.

Stevenson hoped to exploit the rift between the conservative Taft Republicans and the moderate Eisenhower Republicans. In a speech in Baltimore, Stevenson said, "The GOP elephant has two heads nowadays, and I can't tell from day to day who's driving the poor beast, Senator Taft or the General. I doubt that America will entrust its future, its hopes, to the master of a house divided against itself." Stevenson, Truman, and other Democrats campaigning that fall also criticized Senators Joseph McCarthy, William E. Jenner, and other right-wing Republicans for what they believed were reckless and unwarranted attacks and congressional investigations into leading government officials and public servants. In a Salt Lake City speech Stevenson stated that right-wing Republicans were "quick with accusations, with defamatory hints and whispering campaigns when they see a chance to scare or silence those with whom they disagree. Rudely, carelessly, they invade the field of thought, of conscience, which belongs to God, and not to Senators.... McCarthy and men like him can say almost anything, and if my opponent's conscience permits, he can try to help all of them get reelected." Stevenson said that right-wing attacks on government officials such as General George Marshall, who had served Truman as US Secretary of State and US Secretary of Defense, reflected a "middle of the gutter approach" to politics. Truman repeatedly criticized Senator McCarthy's character and temperament and called on Eisenhower to repudiate him. Stevenson ridiculed right-wing Republicans "who hunt Communists in the Bureau of Wildlife and Fisheries while hesitating to aid the gallant men and women who are resisting the real thing in the front lines of Europe and Asia.... They are finally the men who seemingly believe that we can confound the Kremlin by frightening ourselves to death." In return, McCarthy often jokingly confused the names Adlai and Alger, the first name of the convicted Soviet spy Alger Hiss, by stating "Alger, I mean Adlai" in his speeches. McCarthy exploited the fact that Stevenson had defended Hiss as innocent despite all of the evidence otherwise. McCarthy, in response to Stevenson's criticisms, also stated during the campaign that he would like to get on the Stevenson campaign trail "with a club and make a good and loyal American" out of Stevenson.

Neither Stevenson nor Sparkman had been a part of the Truman administration, and both largely ignored its record, preferred to hark back to the Roosevelt's New Deal achievements, and warned against a repetition of the Great Depression under President Herbert Hoover if Eisenhower was elected. The historian Herbert Parmet stated that, "although Stevenson tried to separate his campaign from Truman's record, his efforts failed to dispel the widespread recognition that, for a divided America, torn by paranoia and unable to understand what had disrupted the anticipated tranquility of the postwar world, the time for change had really arrived. Neither Stevenson nor anyone else could have dissuaded the electorate from its desire to repudiate 'Trumanism.'"

Campaign

Eisenhower's goal to unite the Republican Party for the fall campaign led him to campaign with and endorse several Republicans with whom he was uncomfortable. In particular, he resented having to endorse Senator William Jenner's reelection campaign when campaigning in Indianapolis, due to Jenner's accusations against George Marshall as being "a living lie" who was "joining hands once more with this criminal crowd of traitors and Communist appeasers ... under the direction of Mr. Truman and Mr. Acheson." Many Democrats were particularly upset when Eisenhower, on a scheduled campaign swing through Wisconsin, decided not to give a speech he had written criticizing McCarthy's methods without naming him and later allowed himself to be photographed shaking hands with McCarthy as if he had supported McCarthy. Truman, who had once been friends with Eisenhower, never forgot what he saw as a betrayal. He had previously thought Eisenhower would make a good president but said that "he has betrayed almost everything I thought he stood for."

Eisenhower retained his enormous personal popularity from his leading role in World War II, and huge crowds turned out to see him around the nation. His campaign slogan, "I Like Ike," was one of the most popular in American history. Stevenson attracted the support of the young emerging postwar intellectual class, but Eisenhower was seen as more appealing to Main Street. Stevenson was ridiculed in some quarters as too effeminate to be president, which was sometimes used as a euphemism for a male homosexual. The staunchly-conservative New York Daily News called him "Adelaide" Stevenson even though he had a reputation as a ladies' man, divorced in 1949, and remained single throughout 1952.

Nixon scandal and "Checkers speech"
A notable event of the 1952 campaign concerned a scandal that emerged when Richard Nixon, Eisenhower's running mate, was accused by several newspapers of receiving $18,000 in undeclared "gifts" from wealthy donors. In reality, contributions were by design only from early supporters and limited to $1,000, with full accountability. Nixon, who had been accusing the Democrats of hiding corruption, suddenly found himself on the defensive. Eisenhower and his aides even considered dropping Nixon from the ticket  picking Senator William Knowland as a replacement running mate.

Eisenhower, who barely knew Nixon, waffled and refused to comment on the incident. Nixon saved his political career, however, with a dramatic half-hour speech, the "Checkers speech," on live television. In this speech, Nixon denied the charges against him, gave a detailed account of his modest financial assets, and offered a glowing assessment of Eisenhower's candidacy. The highlight of the speech came when Nixon stated that a supporter had given his daughters a gift, a dog named "Checkers," and that he would not return it because his daughters loved it. The "Checkers speech" led hundreds of thousands of citizens nationwide to wire the Republican National Committee to urge the Republican Party to keep Nixon on the ticket, and Eisenhower stayed with him.

Despite the red-baiting of the Republicans' right wing, the campaign on the whole was conducted with a considerable degree of dignity, and Stevenson was seen as reinvigorating a Democratic Party that had become exhausted after 20 years in power and as refreshing its appeal with younger voters. He accused Eisenhower of silently tolerating McCarthy's excesses. Stevenson went before the American Legion, a bastion of hardline conservatism, and boldly declared that there was nothing patriotic or American about what McCarthy was doing.

Even with the dignified nature of the campaign, the dislike between the two candidates was visible. Stevenson criticized Eisenhower's noncondemnation of McCarthy and his use of television spots, and Eisenhower, who had initially respected Stevenson, came in time to view him as simply another career politician, which he strongly disliked.

Television
The 1952 election campaign was the first one to make use of the new medium of television, partly by the efforts of Rosser Reeves, the head of Ted Bates, Inc., a leading advertising firm. Reeves had initially proposed a series of radio spots to Dewey in the 1948 campaign, but Dewey considered them undignified. Reeves later maintained that Dewey might have won the election if he had been slightly more open-minded.

Studying Douglas MacArthur's keynote speech at the Republican Convention in July, Reeves believed that the general's words were "powerful" but "unfocused" and "all over the map." Eisenhower's public speeches were even worse since he was unable to make his point to the voting public in a clear intelligible manner. Reeves felt that Eisenhower needed to condense his message down to a few simple easily-digestible slogans.

Eisenhower at first also fared poorly on television and had a difficult time appearing relaxed and at ease on camera. The television lighting was not flattering and made him look old and unattractive. In particular, his forehead tended to glisten under the lights. Eisenhower became upset when the CBS correspondent Dave Schoenbrun pointed that out and suggested him to try to alter his poses to make his forehead less noticeable and to apply makeup so that it would not shine from the lighting. Eventually, he gave in and agreed to those modifications. Reeves also wanted Eisenhower to not wear his eyeglasses on camera to look younger, but since he could not read the prompter board without them, Reeves devised a large handwritten signboard.

Reeves's television work, although pioneering, was the subject of considerable criticism on the grounds that he was attempting to sell a presidential candidate to the public in the same manner that one might sell a car or a brand of toothpaste. The liberal journalist Marya Mannes mocked the approach with this ditty: "Eisenhower hits the spot/One full general, that's a lot/Feeling sluggish, feeling sick?/Take a dose of Ike and Dick!/Philip Morris, Lucky Strike/Alka Seltzer, I like Ike!" For his part, Stevenson would have nothing to do with television at all and condemned Eisenhower's use of the medium by calling it "selling the presidency like cereal." He made a point of the fact that he did not watch or even own a television, and the same for went many members of his inner circle.

Both campaigns made use of television ads. A notable ad for Eisenhower was an issue-free feel-good animated cartoon with a soundtrack song by Irving Berlin called "I Like Ike." For the first time, a presidential candidate's personal medical history was released publicly, as were partial versions of his financial histories, because of the issues that had been raised in Nixon's speech. Near the end of the campaign, Eisenhower, in a major speech, announced that if he won the election he would go to Korea to see if he could end the war. His great military prestige, combined with the public's weariness with the conflict, gave Eisenhower the final boost he needed to win.

Throughout the entire campaign, Eisenhower led in all opinion polls and by wide margins in most of them.

Citizens for Eisenhower
To circumvent the local Republican Party organizations, which were mostly controlled by Taft supporters, the Eisenhower forces created a nationwide network of grassroots clubs, "Citizens for Eisenhower." Independents and Democrats were welcome, as the group specialized in canvassing neighborhoods and holding small-group meetings. Citizens for Eisenhower hoped to revitalize the party by expanding its activist ranks and by supporting moderate and internationalist policies. It did not endorse candidates other than Eisenhower, but he paid it little attention after he had won, and it failed to maintain its impressive starting momentum. Instead, it energized the conservative Republicans, which led finally to the Barry Goldwater campaign of 1964. Longtime Republican activists viewed the newcomers with suspicion and hostility. More significantly, activism in support of Eisenhower did not translate into enthusiasm for the party's cause.

Results
On election day, Eisenhower won a decisive victory by winning over 55% of the popular vote and carrying 39 of the 48 states. Stevenson did not win a single state north of the Mason–Dixon line or west of Arkansas; he did succeed in winning back the four states which Strom Thurmond had won at the previous election, but lost all but five of the states that Truman had won that year. Eisenhower took three Southern states that the Republicans had won only once since Reconstruction: Virginia, Florida, and Texas. Despite the Republican win in Florida, that year was the last time that a Democrat has won Collier County before southwestern Florida was turned into a growing Sun Belt Republican stronghold, and it was also the last time that a Democrat has won Aiken County, South Carolina, before the "Solid South" would collapse in the wake of the Civil Rights Movement. That year was also, however, the last time a Republican won Yolo County, California or the Native American Rolette County, North Dakota, and the last until Donald Trump in 2016 that the Republicans won Pacific County, Washington, or Swift County, Minnesota. It was the last time the Republicans won Missouri until 1968 and the last time that a Republican won the election without Kentucky. Stevenson's 700-vote win was the smallest percentage margin in any state since Woodrow Wilson had won New Hampshire by 56 votes in 1916.

Eisenhower won in 21 of the 39 cities with a population above 250,000. He won in six of the eight largest Southern cities.

The election was the first in which a computer, the UNIVAC I, was used to predict the results; it came within 3.5% of Eisenhower's popular vote tally and four votes of his electoral vote total.

Source (Popular Vote): Source (Electoral Vote):

Results by state

Close states
Election results in these states were within one percentage point (21 electoral votes):
Kentucky, 0.07% (700 votes)
Tennessee, 0.27% (2,437 votes)

Election results in these states were within five percentage points (36 electoral votes):
South Carolina, 1.44% (4,922 votes)
Missouri, 1.56% (29,599 votes)
Rhode Island, 1.84% (7,642 votes)
West Virginia, 3.85% (33,608 votes)
Delaware, 3.88% (6,744 votes)

Election results in these states were between five and ten percentage points (140 electoral votes):
Louisiana, 5.84% (38,102 votes)
Pennsylvania, 5.88% (269,520 votes)
Texas, 6.44% (133,650 votes)
North Carolina, 7.82% (94,696 votes)
Massachusetts, 8.76% (208,800 votes)
Oklahoma, 9.18% (87,106 votes)
Washington, 9.64% (106,262 votes)
Illinois, 9.90% (443,407 votes)

Tipping point state:
Michigan, 11.47% (320,872 votes)

Statistics

Counties with Highest Percent of Vote (Republican)
 Plaquemines Parish, Louisiana 92.97%
 Gillespie County, Texas 92.29%
 McIntosh County, North Dakota 90.89%
 Campbell County, South Dakota 90.14%
 Kenedy County, Texas 88.52%

Counties with Highest Percent of Vote (Democratic)
 Greene County, North Carolina 94.12%
 Hart County, Georgia 94.08%
 Treutlen County, Georgia 93.34%
 Martin County, North Carolina 92.98%
 Walton County, Georgia 91.89%

See also
1952 United States House of Representatives elections
1952 United States Senate elections
History of the United States (1945–1964)
First inauguration of Dwight D. Eisenhower

References

Further reading
 Ambrose, Stephen E. Eisenhower. Vol. I. Soldier, General of the Army, President Elect 1890–1952 (New York: Simon and Schuster, 1983), pp 550–572.
 Blake, David Haven. Liking Ike: Eisenhower, Advertising, and the Rise of Celebrity Politics (Oxford UP, 2016). xvi, 281 pp.
 Boomhower, Ray E. "All the Way with Adlai: John Bartlow Martin and the 1952 Adlai Stevenson Campaign." Journal of the Illinois State Historical Society 111#3 (2018): 67–102 online.
 Bowen, Michael. The roots of modern conservatism: Dewey, Taft, and the battle for the soul of the Republican party (2011)
 Converse, Philip E., Warren E. Miller, Donald E. Stokes, Angus Campbell. The American Voter (1964) the classic political science study of voters in 1952 and 1956
  5 vol of details on each region
 Davies, Gareth, and Julian E. Zelizer, eds. America at the Ballot Box: Elections and Political History (2015) pp. 167–83, role of television.
 Davies, James C. "Charisma in the 1952 Campaign." American Political Science Review 48#4 (1954): 1083–102. doi:10.2307/1951012.  online.

 Donaldson, Gary. When America Liked Ike: How Moderates Won the 1952 Presidential Election and Reshaped American Politics (2016) 137pp.
 Grant, Keneshia N. "Great Migration Politics: The Impact of The Great Migration on Democratic Presidential Election campaigns from 1948–1960." Du Bois Review: Social Science Research on Race 16.1 (2019): 37-61.
 Grant, Philip A. "Eisenhower and the 1952 Republican Invasion of the South: The Case of Virginia." Presidential Studies Quarterly 20#2  (1990): 285–93. online.
 Greene, John Robert. I Like Ike: The Presidential Election of 1952 (2017) excerpt
 Halberstam, David. The Fifties. (New York: Fawcett Columbine, 1993) online
 Hyman, Herbert H. and Paul B. Sheatsley. "The political appeal of President Eisenhower", Public Opinion Quarterly, 17 (1953–54), pp. 443–60 online
 Johnstone, Andrew , and Andrew Priest, eds.  US Presidential Elections and Foreign Policy: Candidates, Campaigns, and Global Politics from FDR to Bill Clinton (2017) pp 82–104. online

 
 McCullough, David. Truman. New York: Simon & Schuster. (1992)
 
 Martin, John Bartlow. Adlai Stevenson of Illinois (1976) vol 1 covers his campaign in depth
 Medhurst, Martin J. "Text and Context in the 1952 Presidential Campaign: Eisenhower's 'I Shall Go to Korea' Speech." Presidential Studies Quarterly 30.3 (2000): 464–484. online
 Murphy, John M. "Civic republicanism in the modern age: Adlai Stevenson in the 1952 presidential campaign." Quarterly Journal of Speech (1994) 80#3 pp 313–328.
 Parmet, Herbert S. Eisenhower and the American crusades (1972) online
 

 Smith, Jean Edward. Eisenhower in War and Peace (2012) pp. 498–549 
 Strong, Donald S. "The presidential election in the South, 1952." Journal of Politics 17.3 (1955): 343–389. online

 White, John Kenneth. "1952: The Transforming Election." in Still Seeing Red (Routledge, 2018) pp. 79-103.

Primary sources

 Chester, Edward W  A guide to political platforms (1977) online
 Porter, Kirk H. and Donald Bruce Johnson, eds. National party platforms, 1840–1964 (1965) online 1840–1956

External links
Newsreel on Eisenhower campaign
1952 popular vote by counties
1952 State-by-state Popular vote
The Decision Not to Run in 1952, an excerpt from a Truman biography from a University of Virginia

The Living Room Candidate: Presidential Campaign Commercials: 1952
Eisenhower's 1952 presidential campaign, Dwight D. Eisenhower Presidential Library 
 Election of 1952 in Counting the Votes

 
Articles containing video clips
Presidency of Dwight D. Eisenhower
Dwight D. Eisenhower
Richard Nixon